Rahmatabad (also Romanized as Raḩmatābād) is a village in Gowdin Rural District, in the Central District of Kangavar County, Kermanshah Province, Iran. At the 2006 census, its population was 706, in 180 families.

References 

Populated places in Kangavar County